This is a list of wadis in Libya. This list is arranged  by region from west to east, with respective tributaries indented under each larger stream's name.

Tripolitania

Wadi Awwal
Wadi Tanarut
Wadi Maymun
Wadi Majer - near Zliten
Wadi al Mujaynin
Wadi Turghut (west)
Wadi al Masid
Wadi Turghut (east)
Wadi Labdah
Wadi Ki'am (Wadi Targhalat) - Libya's only perennial stream
Wadi Sawfajjin
Wadi Zamzam
Wadi Bey al Kabir
Wadi Thamit
Wadi Jarif
Wadi Tilal
Wadi ar Rijl (Wadi Matratin)

Fezzan

Wadi Tanezzuft
Wadi Barjuj
Wadi ash Shati
Wadi Umm al Ara'is
Wasi an Nashu

Cyrenaica

Wadi al Qattarah
Wadi Darnah
Wadi al Khalij
Wadi Husayn
Wadi al Mu'allaq
Wadi at Tamimi
Wadi al Farigh
Wadi al Hamim

See also
Great Manmade River

References
Rand McNally, The New International Atlas,1993.
Topographic map of western Libya. Defense Mapping Agency, 1984 (18.4 MB)
 GEOnet Names Server

Libya
Rivers